Hirsig is a surname. Notable people with the surname include:

Alma Hirsig Bliss (1875–c. 1959), American miniature painter
Leah Hirsig (1883–1975), Swiss-American Thelemite
Santiago Hirsig (born 1978), Argentine footballer
William G. Hirsig (1868–1924), American automobile dealer

See also 
Louis Hirsig House, historic house in Madison, Wisconsin